Hopewell Township may refer to:

 Hopewell Township, Beaver County, Pennsylvania
 Hopewell Township, Bedford County, Pennsylvania
 Hopewell Township, Cumberland County, Pennsylvania
 Hopewell Township, Huntingdon County, Pennsylvania
 Hopewell Township, Washington County, Pennsylvania
 Hopewell Township, York County, Pennsylvania

See also
 Hopewell, Pennsylvania (disambiguation)
 East Hopewell Township, York County, Pennsylvania
 North Hopewell Township, York County, Pennsylvania

Pennsylvania township disambiguation pages